Mitchel Lee Hyman (born July 15, 1954), best known by his stage name Mickey Leigh, is an American musician and writer. He is the brother of Joey Ramone, lead vocalist of the punk rock band Ramones.

Career

Mickey Leigh formed his first band at the age of 10. At the age of 14 Leigh was playing in a band with John Cummings (Johnny Ramone) and Tommy Erdelyi (Tommy Ramone). In 1977 he formed a band, Birdland, with music journalist Lester Bangs. The group recorded nine songs which were finally released in 1986, four years after Bangs' death, on the album Birdland with Lester Bangs. Creem magazine described it as “the best rock ‘n’ roll album of 1986".

Leigh's next band was The Rattlers. The group released two singles and one album in 1985. In 1994 he formed Sibling Rivalry with his brother Joey Ramone. Two years later Leigh recorded an album with his new band STOP. Leigh has also been working as producer for several New York based groups.

In 2009 Leigh published the book I Slept with Joey Ramone: A Family Memoir. On April 15, 2021, the 20th anniversary of Joey Ramone's death, it was announced that a Netflix movie of Leigh's book was being made with Pete Davidson portraying Joey Ramone. Leigh will serve as an executive producer. The film is being made with the full cooperation and support of Ramone’s estate, with a treatment written by Davidson and director Jason Orley.

Leigh's current project is Mickey Leigh's Mutated Music.  In early 2022, they released a new album, Variants of Vibe, through Wicked Cool Records.

Discography 
The following can be verified through AllMusic.

Albums 
The Rattlers
Rattled! (1985)
Birdland
Birdland with Lester Bangs (1986)
STOP
Never (1996)

Singles and EPs 
The Rattlers
On the Beach (1979)
What Keeps Your Heart Beatin’? (1983)
Sibling Rivalry
In a Family Way (1994)

References 
Notes

Literature

External links

1954 births
People from Forest Hills, Queens
Jewish American musicians
Musicians from New York (state)
Living people
Jews in punk rock
21st-century American Jews